Aechmea andersonii is a species of flowering plant in the genus Aechmea. This species is endemic to the State of Bahia in Brazil but cultivated elsewhere as an ornamental.

Cultivars
 Aechmea 'John Anderson'

References

andersonii
Flora of Brazil
Plants described in 1998